Jóannes Jakobsen (born 25 August 1961) is a former Faroese football defender, as well as musician and composer, having released three albums on the Faroe Islands and produced a number of albums for other artists. He is the former assistant coach of Faroe Islands. He is currently head youth manager for the Faroese team EB/Streymur.

Club career
He played over 20 years with Faroese top team, HB Tórshavn, where he also became player/coach in 1994. He was also player and manager of several other Faroese clubs.

International career
Jakobsen made his debut for the Faroe Islands in an April 1989 friendly match against Canada, immediately skippering them to their first ever win since joining FIFA. He remained captain of the team during those first years, most notably during their historic victory over Austria in 1990. His final international match was a September 1993 World Cup qualifying match against Romania. He has collected 25 caps, though never scoring any goals.

Career in music

Albums 
 Hvat bagir, 1990
 Royn tínar veingir, 1995
 Myrkursins gongumenn, 1998

Appears on 
Vit herja á, 1990
Reytt og svart, 1993
Sangur til frælsi, 2000
Hetta er eisini mítt land, M'as Blues Band, 2001
Hetta er eisini mítt land II, M'as Blues Band, 2003
Kyndil 50 ár, 2006

Compilation 
Tólvti maður, 1998
Alt, Kim Hansen, 2005

References

External links
 
 Profile at B68

1961 births
Living people
People from Tórshavn
Faroese footballers
Faroe Islands international footballers
Faroese football managers
Faroese male singers
Association football defenders
VB Vágur players
Havnar Bóltfelag players
KÍ Klaksvík players
B68 Toftir players
KÍ Klaksvík managers
B36 Tórshavn managers
Argja Bóltfelag managers